Psydrax faulknerae is a species of flowering plant in the family Rubiaceae. It is found in Kenya and Tanzania.

References

faulknerae
Vulnerable plants
Taxonomy articles created by Polbot
Taxa named by Diane Mary Bridson